was a Japanese waka poet and nobleman during the Heian period.

Poetry 
One of his poems is included in Hyakunin Isshu:

External links 
E-text of his poems in Japanese

Tokudaiji family
1139 births
1192 deaths
12th-century Japanese poets
Hyakunin Isshu poets